The Television Critics Association (TCA) is a group of approximately 200 United States and Canadian television critics, journalists and columnists who cover television programming for newspapers, magazines and web publications. The TCA accepts applications and selects members twice per year in March and September. Once selected, all members meet at The Langham Huntington Hotel and Spa in Pasadena, California in January for the winter press tour, and at the Beverly Hilton in Beverly Hills in July for the summer press tour. Winter press tour usually covers network midseason replacements, programs from streaming services and cable series which start in January, while the summer tour covers the new fall season for broadcast, streaming, and cable programming.

Press tours
The tour allows the major television networks, cable networks, online streaming services and PBS to present their slate of upcoming programs to a large group of press writers from different outlets all at once through panels and interviews, along with 'state of the network' speeches and presentations; for instance, FX executive John Landgraf uses his network's winter session to present data and analytical information from his network's research department, including the number of series carried across all American networks and streaming services in a year to compare with FX's slate of original programming. This is also the only time the general television media has rare access en masse to network executives. These biannual conferences involve registered TCA members staying at a chosen Los Angeles venue for two to three weeks, and each network is assigned a series of days to showcase their programming.

In the past, these interviews with program casts and creative staff (usually the show's primary showrunner, producers, and writers) were mainly used to compile stories over a six-month period which could be posted over that period as columns, Q&A responses to reader mail questions timed to a program/film/special's release, or within their weekly television listings supplements, mainly in newspapers or magazines for critics and columnists outside of large metropolitan areas. However, with the rise of the Internet and social media, these sessions now function to build buzz for programming within an immediate period, and only a few columnists for smaller publications and listing supplements maintain the former format of story release.

The January 2008 tour was canceled in December 2007 because of the 2007-08 Writers Guild of America strike and the uncertainty of its settlement. At the start of May 2020, the organization cancelled their summer 2020 tour and delayed the TCA Awards to a time to be determined in the wake of the coronavirus pandemic making any large gathering over two weeks impossible, along with the uncertainty  over the 2020-21 television season, including the conversion of network upfront presentations to videotelephony platforms and the ability to produce programming.

TCA Awards

The organization sponsors the TCA Awards, honoring television excellence in 11 categories, which are presented at the end of the summer press tour. The Awards began in 1985 at the Century Plaza Hotel in Los Angeles, California. The 2017 Awards were hosted by Kristin Chenoweth. The awards given in 2017 included; Program of the Year, Best New Program, Best Drama Series, Individual Achievement in Drama, Best Comedy Series, Individual Achievement in Comedy, Best Reality Programming, Best Youth Programming, & Best News and Information. In addition to these awards, each year the TCA grants the 
Heritage Award, given to a long-standing program that has culturally influenced society.

In 2018, the 34th TCA Awards were hosted by Robin Thede.

References

External links
 Official website ~ TVcritics.org
 TCA Awards page ~ TVcritics.
 Television Critics Association – The TCA welcomes you. (2017). Retrieved November 9, 2017, from http://tvcritics.org/ 
 Rodman, S. (2017). “The Handmaid”s Tale,’ “Atlanta,” Carrie Coon big winners at the Television Critics Assn. awards - LA Times. Retrieved from http://www.latimes.com/entertainment/la-et-entertainment-news-updates-august-the-handmaid-s-tale-atlanta-1502038279-htmlstory.html

American television awards
Canadian television awards
Entertainment industry societies
Television organizations in Canada
Television organizations in the United States
Events in Los Angeles
January events
July events